This list of the Paleozoic life of Montana contains the various prehistoric life-forms whose fossilized remains have been reported from within the US state of Montana and are between 538.8 and 252.17 million years of age.

A

 †Acanthocrania
 †Acanthocrania spinosa – type locality for species
 †Acanthograptus
 †Acanthopecten
 †Acanthopecten coloradoensis
 †Achistrum
 †Achistrum coloculum
 †Achistrum gamma
 †Achistrum monochordata
 †Acrothele
 †Acrothele colleni – type locality for species
 †Acrothele pentagonensis
 †Acrotreta
 †Acrotreta attica – or unidentified comparable form
 †Actinopteria
 †Actinopteria subdecussata – or unidentified comparable form
 †Adetognathus
 †Adetognathus gigantus
 †Adetognathus lautus
 †Adetognathus spathus
 †Aenigmacaris – type locality for genus
 †Aenigmacaris cornigerum – type locality for species

 †Aesopichthys – type locality for genus
 †Aesopichthys erinaceus – type locality for species
 †Albertella – type locality for genus
 †Albertella hellena – type locality for species
 †Allanaria
   †Allenypterus – type locality for genus
 †Allenypterus montanus – type locality for species
 †Allorisma
 †Ambocoelia
 †Ambocoelia gregaria
 †Ambothyris
 †Ameura – tentative report
 Ammodiscus
 †Amphiscapha
 †Amplexizaphrentis
 †Amplexizaphrentis spinulosus – or unidentified comparable form
 †Amplexus
 †Angulotreta
 †Angyomphalus – tentative report
 †Angyomphalus excavatus – type locality for species
 †Anisotrypa
 †Ankhelasma
 †Annuliconcha
 †Anoria
 †Anthracospirifer
 †Anthracospirifer curvilateralis – type locality for species
 †Anthracospirifer occidus
 †Anthracospirifer shoshonensis
 †Anthracospirifer welleri
 †Antiquatonia
 †Antiquatonia coloradoensis
 †Antiquatonia pernodosa – type locality for species
 †Apatokephalus
 †Apatokephalus canadensis – or unidentified comparable form
 †Aphelaeceras
 †Aphelaspis
 †Apheoorthis
 †Apheoorthis ocha
 †Aporthophyla
 †Apotocardium
 †Apotocardium latifasciatum
 †Arceodomus
 †Arceodomus glabrata – type locality for species
 †Archisymplectes
 †Archisymplectes rhothon
 †Arctospirifer
 †Arctospirifer allegheniensis – or unidentified comparable form
 †Asaphellus
 †Astartella
 †Astreptoscolex
 †Astreptoscolex anasillosus
 †Athyris
  †Atrypa
 †Aulacoparia
 †Aulacoparia impressa – type locality for species
 †Aulacoparia wibauxensis
  †Aulopora
  †Aviculopecten
 †Aviculopecten kaibabensis – or unidentified comparable form
 †Aviculopinna
 †Avonia
 †Avonia arcuata – tentative report
 †Axiodeaneia

B

 †Babylonites
 †Bactrites
 †Bactrites nitidus
 Bairdia
 †Barytichisma
 †Barytichisma amsdenense
 †Basilicorhynchus
 †Basilicorhynchus ventricosum
 †Bathyuriscus
 †Bathyuriscus formosus – or unidentified comparable form
 †Beagiascus – type locality for genus
 †Beagiascus pulcherrimus – type locality for species
 †Beecheria
 †Beecheria paraplicata – type locality for species
  †Belantsea – type locality for genus
 †Belantsea montana – type locality for species
 †Bellefontia
  †Bellerophon
 †Bellerophon deflectus
 †Bifungites
 †Bifungites bisagitta
 †Billingsella
 †Blountia
 †Bolaspis
 †Brachythyris
 †Bradyphyllum
 †Bradyphyllum clavigerum – type locality for species
 †Bryantodus
 †Bryantodus crassidens
 †Bryantodus scitulus
 †Bryograptus
 †Bucanella
 †Bulimorpha
 †Bulimorpha elegans
 †Burnetiella
 †Buxtonia
 †Buxtonia arizonensis
 †Bynumiella – tentative report
 †Bynumina

C

 †Cactocrinus – tentative report
 †Caenanoplia – tentative report
 †Caenanoplia logani – or unidentified related form
 †Callograptus
 †Camaraspis
 †Camarophorella
 †Camarophorella buckleyi – or unidentified comparable form
 †Camarotoechia
 †Camarotoechia C. chouteauensis – or unidentified comparable form
 †Camarotoechia C. inaequa Shaw – or unidentified comparable form
 †Camarotoechia contracta
 †Camarotoechia crenistria
 †Camarotoechia elegantula
 †Camarotoechia herrickana – or unidentified related form
 †Camarotoechia metallica
 †Camarotoechia mettalica – or unidentified comparable form
 †Camarotoechia mutata
 †Camarotoechia tuta
 †Canadiphyllum
 †Caninia
 †Caninia montanensis – type locality for species
 †Carbosesostris – type locality for genus
 †Carbosesostris megaliphagon – type locality for species
  †Caridosuctor – type locality for genus
 †Caridosuctor populosum – type locality for species
 †Carinoclymenia
 †Cavusgnathus
 †Cavusgnathus alta
 †Cavusgnathus naviculus
 †Ceratopea
 †Ceratopea sinclairensis
 †Ceratreta
 †Cheilocephalus
 †Cheilocephalus brevilobus
 †Cheiloceras
 †Cheiloceras simplex
 †Chilotrypa – tentative report
 †Chonetes
 †Chonetes geniculatus
 †Chonetes loganensis
 †Chonetes logani
 †Chonetes ornatus
  †Cladodus
 †Clavallus
 †Clavallus spicaudina
  †Cleiothyridina
 †Cleiothyridina atrypoides
 †Cleiothyridina ciriacksi – type locality for species
 †Cleiothyridina coloradoensis – or unidentified comparable form
 †Cleiothyridina devonica
 †Cleiothyridina hirsuta
 †Cleiothyridina incrassata – or unidentified related form
 †Cleiothyridina sublamellosa
 †Cleiothyridnia
 †Cleiothyridnia sublamellosa
 †Cleistopora
 †Cleistopora placenta
 †Clelandia
 †Cliffia
 †Clionolithes
 †Clonograptus
  †Composita
 †Composita humilis
 †Composita laevis
 †Composita lateralis – or unidentified comparable form
 †Composita madisonensis
 †Composita ovata
 †Composita ozarkana
 †Composita sulcata
 †Conularia
  †Cornulites
 †Cornulites carbonarius
 †Costatoblastus – type locality for genus
 †Costatoblastus sappingtonensis – type locality for species
 †Cranaena – tentative report
 †Cranaena circularis – type locality for species
  †Crania
 †Crania blairi – or unidentified comparable form
 †Crania rowleyi
 †Croixana
 †Crurithyris
 †Crurithyris minuta
 †Crurithyris parva – or unidentified comparable form
 †Cryptonella – tentative report
 †Cryptonella pinyonensis – or unidentified comparable form
 †Crytina
 †Crytina acutirostris
 †Culmicrinus
 †Culmicrinus jeffersonensis – or unidentified comparable form
 †Cupularostrum
 †Cupularostrum contracta
 †Cyathaxonia
 †Cypricardella
 †Cyranorhis – type locality for genus
 †Cyranorhis bergeraci – type locality for species
 †Cyrtina
 †Cyrtina acutirostris – or unidentified comparable form
 †Cyrtiopsis – tentative report
 †Cyrtodiscus
 †Cyrtorostra
 †Cyrtorostra varicostata
  †Cyrtospirifer
 †Cyrtospirifer animaensis
 †Cyrtospirifer animasensis – or unidentified comparable form
 †Cyrtospirifer bertrandi – type locality for species
 †Cyrtospirifer gallatinensis
 †Cyrtospirifer hornellensis
 †Cyrtospirifer monticola
 †Cyrtospirifer perryi – type locality for species
 †Cyrtospirifer thalattodoxa – tentative report
 †Cyrtospirifer whitneyi
 †Cystodictya

D

 †Damocles – type locality for genus
 †Damocles serratus – type locality for species
 †Deadwoodia
 †Debeerius – type locality for genus
 †Debeerius ellefseni – type locality for species
 †Dellea
  †Delphyodontos – type locality for genus
 †Delphyodontos dacriformes – type locality for species
 †Delthyris – tentative report
 †Dendrograptus
 †Dentinella
 †Derbyia
 †Deuteronectanebos – type locality for genus
 †Deuteronectanebos papillorum – type locality for species
 †Diaphelasma
 †Diaphragmus
 †Diaphragmus fasciculatus
 †Dicellomus
 †Dicellomus occidentalis
 †Dictyclostus
 †Dictyclostus richardsi
 †Dictyoclostus
 †Dictyoclostus ferglenensis – or unidentified comparable form
 †Dictyoclostus gallatinensis
 †Dictyoclostus inflatus
 †Dictyoclostus richardsi
 †Dictyoclosyus
 †Dictyoclosyus inflatus
 †Dictyonema
 †Dielasma
  †Dikelocephalus
 †Dimegelasma
 †Dinotocrinus
 †Discoserra – type locality for genus
 †Discoserra pectinodon – type locality for species

 †Distomodus
 †Dithyrocaris
 †Dithyrocaris rolfei – type locality for species

 †Ditodus
 †Drepanodus
 †Drepanodus subarcuatus
 †Drumaspis
 †Dysoristus

E

 †Echinaria
 †Echinauris – or unidentified related form
 †Echinochimaera – type locality for genus
 †Echinochimaera meltoni – type locality for species

 †Echinochimaera snyderi – type locality for species
 †Echinocoelia
 †Echinocoelia youngstownensis
 †Echinoconchus
 †Echinoconchus alternatus – or unidentified related form
 †Echinoconchus angustus – type locality for species
 †Echinocrinus
 †Edmondia
 †Edmondia E. marionensis – or unidentified comparable form
 †Edmondia stuchburia
 †Ehmania – tentative report
 †Eleutherokomma
 †Eleutherokomma raymondi
 †Elrathiella – or unidentified comparable form
 †Elrathina
 †Elvinia
 †Elvinia roemeria
 †Emanuella
 †Enygmophyllum
 Eocaudina
 †Eocaudina columcanthus
 †Eocaudina marginata
 †Eocaudina subhexagona
 †Eolissochonetes
 †Eolissochonetes pseudoliratus – type locality for species
 †Eoorthis
 †Eoorthis remnicha
 †Euconia
 †Euconia umbilicata
 †Euloma
 †Eumetria
 †Eumetria acuticosta
 †Eumetria vera – or unidentified comparable form
 †Eumetria verneuilana – or unidentified comparable form
 †Eumetria verneuiliana – or unidentified comparable form
 †Euphemites
 †Euphemites crenulatus
 †Euphemites sacajawensis
 †Euphemitopsis
 †Euphemitopsis paucinodosus – or unidentified comparable form
 †Euphemitopsis subpapillosa
 †Exochops

F

 †Faberophyllum
  †Falcatus
 †Falcatus falcatus
 †Fasciculiamplexus
 †Fasciculophyllum
  †Favosites
 †Fenestella
 †Fenestralia – tentative report
 †Fenestrella
 †Finestrella – tentative report
 †Floweria
 †Floweria chemungensis – or unidentified comparable form
 †Furcaster

G

 †Gattendorfia
 †Gattendorfia costata
 †Gennaeocrinus – or unidentified comparable form
  †Geragnostus
 †Girtyella
 †Girtyella indianensis
 †Girtyella woodsworthi – or unidentified comparable form
 †Girtyella woodworthi
 †Glabretina – type locality for genus
 †Glabretina andrewsi – type locality for species
 †Glabrocingulum – tentative report
 †Glaphyraspis
 †Glaphyraspis parva
 †Glossopleura
 †Glyphaspis
 †Glyphaspis robusta
 †Grammysia
 †Grammysia G. welleri – or unidentified comparable form
 †Graphiadactyllis
 †Guizhoupecten

H

 †Hadronector – type locality for genus
 †Hadronector donbairdi – type locality for species
 †Hallograptus
 †Hamburgia – tentative report
 †Hamburgia walteri – or unidentified comparable form
 †Hammatocyclus
 †Haplistion
 †Hapsiphyllum
 †Hardistiella – type locality for genus
 †Hardistiella montanensis – type locality for species
  †Harpagofututor – type locality for genus
 †Harpagofututor volsellorhinus – type locality for species
   †Helicoprion
 †Heteralosia
 †Heteralosia beecheri
 †Heteropecten
 †Heteropecten vanvleeti – or unidentified comparable form
 †Heteropetalus  – type locality for genus
 †Heteropetalus elegantulus  – type locality for species

 †Homalophyllites
 †Homotreta
 †Homotreta interrupta
 †Hormotoma
 †Horridonia – report made of unidentified related form or using admittedly obsolete nomenclature
 †Housia
 †Housia canadensis
 †Huenella
 †Hunanospirifer
 †Hunanospirifer animasensis
 †Hunanospirifer gallatinensis – tentative report
 †Hunanospirifer monticola
 †Hustedia
 †Hustedia texana
  †Hyolithes
 Hyperammina
 †Hypothyris
 †Hypseloconus
 †Hypseloconus elongatus
 †Hypseloconus simplex
 †Hystriculina
 †Hystriculina wabashensis – or unidentified comparable form
 †Hystricurus

I

 †Icodonta
 †Icodonta nixonensis – or unidentified comparable form
 †Icodonta typica
 †Idahoia
 †Imbrexia
 †Imbricatia
 †Imitoceras
 †Inflatia
 †Inflatia inflata – or unidentified comparable form
 †Iphidella
 †Iphidella hexagona
 †Iphidella nyssa
 †Irvingella

J

  †Janassa
 †Janassa clarki – type locality for species
 †Joanellia
 †Joanellia lundi
 †Juresania

K

 †Kainella
 †Kainella flagricauda
 †Kallimorphocrinus
 †Kalops
 †Kalops diophrys
 †Kalops monophrys
 †Katabuporhynchus
 †Katabuporhynchus mesacostalis
 †Kayseraspis
  †Kendallina
 †Kindbladia
 †Komiella
 †Komiella ostiolata
 †Koninkophyllum – tentative report
 †Kootenia
 †Kyphocephalus

L

 †Labiostria
 †Laminatia
 †Laminatia laminata – tentative report
 †Langepis
 †Langepis campbelli
 †Lecanospira
 †Leioestheria
 †Leioproductus
 †Leioproductus coloradensis
 †Leioproductus montanensis – type locality for species
 †Leioproductus plicatus
 †Leiorhynchus
 †Leiorhynchus carboniferus
 †Leiorhynchus dunbarense – or unidentified comparable form
 †Leiorhynchus gibbosa – or unidentified comparable form
 †Leiorhynchus jeffersonense
 †Leiorhynchus lesleyi
 †Leiorhynchus seversoni
 †Leiorhynchus ventricosa
 †Leiorhynchus ventricosta – or unidentified related form
 †Lepidasterella
 †Lepidasterella montanensis – type locality for species
 †Leptaena
 †Leptagonia
 †Leptagonia analoga
 †Leptalosia
 †Leptalosia scintilla – tentative report
 †Leptella
 †Leptodesma
 †Leptodus
 †Leptotrypella
 †Liardiphyllum
 †Licnocephala
 †Limipecten
 †Limipecten grandicostatus – or unidentified comparable form
 †Limipecten otterensis – type locality for species
 †Lineagruan – type locality for genus
 †Lineagruan judithi – type locality for species
 †Lineagruan snowyi – type locality for species
  †Lingula
 †Lingula carbonaria – or unidentified comparable form
  †Lingulella
 †Lingulella ibicus
 †Lingulepis
 †Linnarssonella
 †Linnarssonella girtyi
 †Linnarssonia
 †Linnarssonia perplexa
 †Linnarssonia rotunda
 †Linoproductus
 †Linoproductus croneisi
 †Linoproductus duodenaris – type locality for species
 †Linoproductus nodosus
 †Linoproductus ovatus
 †Lioestheria
 †Lithostrotion
 †Lithostrotionella
 †Lithostrotionella microstylum Grity
 Lituotuba – tentative report
 †Lloydia
 †Lloydia incomperta
 †Lloydia manitouensis – or unidentified comparable form
 †Lochmocercus – type locality for genus
 †Lochmocercus aciculodontus – type locality for species
 †Lonchodina
 †Lonchodina projecta
 †Longiclava – type locality for genus
 †Longiclava tumida – type locality for species
 †Loxonema
 †Loxonema approximatum
 †Lyroschizodus
 †Lyroschizodus oklahomensis – or unidentified comparable form

M

 †Macluritella
 †Macluritella stantoni – or unidentified related form
 †Macronoda
 †Maladia
 †Marginifera
 †Marginovatia
 †Marginovatia duodenaria
 †Martinia
 †Maryvillia
 †Maryvillia omega – type locality for species
 †Mastigograptus
 †Megalaspidella
  †Megistaspis
 †Megistocrinus – or unidentified comparable form
 †Metriophyllum
 †Michelinia
 †Microantyx
 †Microantyx botoni
 †Microantyx mudgei
 †Microantyx permiana
 †Micromitra
 †Micromitra sculptilis
 †Micromitra subdita
 †Millerella
 †Monocheilus
 †Mooreoceras – tentative report
 †Multivasculatus
 †Myalina
 †Myalina meeki
 †Myalina parallela – type locality for species

N

 †Nanorthis
 †Nanorthis putilla
  †Naticopsis
 †Naticopsis remex – or unidentified comparable form
 †Nemavermes
 †Nemavermes mackeei
 †Neoprioniodus
  †Neospirifer
 †Neospirifer praenuntius – type locality for species
 †Neospirifer striatus
 †Neozaphrentis
 †Neozaphrentis parasitica
 †Netsepoye – type locality for genus
 †Netsepoye hawesi – type locality for species
 †Nickelsopora
 †Nisusia
 †Nisusia deissi
 †Nisusia lickensis
 †Nisusia montanaensis
 †Nix – type locality for genus
 †Nix angulata – type locality for species
 †Nucleospira
 †Nucleospira obesa
 Nuculana
 †Nuculana biangulata – type locality for species
 †Nuculopsis
 †Nuculopsis poposiensis

O

 †Obolus
  †Ogyginus
 †Olenopsis
 †Orbiculoidea
 †Orbiculoidea interlineata – type locality for species
 †Orbiculoidea missouriensis – or unidentified comparable form
 †Orbiculoidea utahensis
 †Orbinaria
 †Orthonychia
 †Orthotetes
  †Orygmaspis
 †Ovatia
 †Ovatia croneisi
 †Oxinoxis
 †Ozarkodina
 †Ozarkodina deflecta
 †Ozarkodina elongata
 †Ozarkodina macilenta
 †Ozarkodina modesta
 †Ozarkodina regularis

P

 †Paladin – tentative report
 †Palaeoneilo
 †Palaeoneilo elongata
 †Palaeonucula
 †Palaeonucula montanensis
 †Paleolimulus
 †Paleolimulus longispinus
 †Papilionichthys – type locality for genus
 †Papilionichthys stahlae – type locality for species
 †Parabolinoides
 †Paracyclus
 †Paraparchites
 †Paraphorhynchus
 †Paraphorhynchus ashboughense – type locality for species
 †Paraphorhynchus jeffersonense
 †Paraphorhynchus madisonense
 †Paraphorhynchus threeforkensis – type locality for species
 †Paraphorhynchus threeforksense
 †Paratarrasius – type locality for genus
 †Paratarrasius hibbardi – type locality for species

 †Pegmatrea – or unidentified related form
  †Pelagiella
 †Peltabellia
 †Peltabellia willistoni – type locality for species
 †Pennireptepora
  †Pentremites
 †Perditocardinia
 †Pericyclus
 †Pericyclus rockymontanus – type locality for species
 †Permophorus
 †Permophorus albequus
 †Pernoceras
 †Pernoceras crebriseptum
  †Peronopsis
 †Peronopsis scutalis – or unidentified comparable form
 †Petalorhynchus
 †Petalorhynchus beargulchensis – type locality for species
 †Petrocrania
 †Petrocrania modesta – or unidentified comparable form
 †Phestia
 †Phestia rugodorsata – type locality for species
 †Phiops – type locality for genus
 †Phiops aciculorum – type locality for species
 †Pinctus
  †Pinna
 †Pinna ludlovi
 †Plagioglypta
   †Platyceras
 †Platyceras niagarensis – or unidentified comparable form
  †Platyclymenia
 †Platyclymenia montana
 †Platycrinus
 †Platycrinus bozemanensis
 †Platycrinus incomptus
 †Plectodiscus
 †Plectodiscus latinautilus
 †Plectospira – tentative report
 †Plectospira problematica – or unidentified comparable form
 †Plethopeltis
 †Plethospira
 †Pleuroclymenia
 †Pleuroclymenia americana
 †Polidevcia
 †Polidevcia obesa
 †Polyosteorhynchus – type locality for genus
 †Polyosteorhynchus simplex – type locality for species
 †Polypora
 †Polyrhizodus
 †Polyrhizodus digitatus
 †Praepatokephalus
 †Presbynileus
 †Proceramala – type locality for genus
 †Proceramala montanensis – type locality for species
 †Procostatoria
 †Procostatoria sexradiata
 †Prodentalium
 †Prodentalium canna
 †Productella
 †Productella coloradensis
 †Productella coloradoense – or unidentified comparable form
 †Productella coloradoensis
 †Productella plicata – or unidentified comparable form
 †Productella spinerga – or unidentified comparable form
 †Productus
  †Proetus
 †Prographularia
 †Prographularia groenlandica – or unidentified comparable form
 †Promesus
 †Proplina
 †Proplina loganensis – type locality for species
 †Protopliomerops
 †Prototreta
 †Prototreta flabellata
 †Prototreta subcircularis
 †Prototreta trapeza
 †Psalikilus
 †Psalikilus paraspinosum
 †Psammodus
 †Pseudagnostus
 †Pseudoclelandia
 †Pseudodicellomus
 †Pseudogastrioceras
 †Pseudomonotis
 †Pseudopermophorus
 †Pseudopermophorus annettae – type locality for species
 †Pseudozygopleura
 †Pseudozygopleura scitula – or unidentified related form
 †Pterocephalia
 †Ptilograptus
  †Ptychagnostus
  †Ptychagnostus atavus
 †Ptychaspis
 †Ptychomalotoechia
 †Ptychomalotoechia sobrina
  †Ptychoparia
 †Ptyocephalus
 †Ptyocephalus montanensis – type locality for species
 †Pugnoides
 †Pugnoides parvulus
 †Punctolira
 †Punctolira punctolira
 †Punctospirifer
 †Punctospirifer transversus
 †Pustula

R

 †Rachistognathus
 †Rainerichthys – type locality for genus
 †Rainerichthys zangerli – type locality for species
 †Ramesses – type locality for genus
 †Ramesses magnus – type locality for species
 †Ramiporalia
 †Raphistomina
 †Renalcis
 †Reticularia
 †Reticulariina
 †Reticulariina browni
 †Reticulariina spinosa
 †Reticularina
 †Reticularina spinosa
 †Retispira
 †Reubenella – type locality for genus
 †Reubenella rex – type locality for species
 †Rhabdomeson
 †Rhineoderma
 †Rhipidomella
 †Rhipidomella missouriensis
 †Rhipidomella newalbanensis – or unidentified comparable form
 †Rhombopora
 †Rhynchopora
 †Rhynchotreta – tentative report
 †Rhytiophora
 †Rhytiophora arcuatus
 †Rhytiopora
 †Rhytiopora arcuatus – tentative report
 †Rota
 †Rota martini
 †Rotiphyllum
 †Rugoclostus
 †Rylstonia
 †Rystonia
 †Rystonia R. teres (Grity) – or unidentified comparable form

S

 Saccammina
 †Sanguinolites
 †Sanguinolites altidorsata – type locality for species
 †Saratogia
 †Saukia
 †Scalarituba
 †Scalarituba missouriensis
 †Scapallina
 †Scapallina phosphoriensis
 †Scaphellina
 †Scaphellina concinna
 †Scaphiomanon – type locality for genus
 †Scaphiomanon hadros – type locality for species
 †Scaphiomanon nodulosum – type locality for species
 †Schallwienella
 †Schellwienella
 †Schellwienella inflata
 †Schizambon
 †Schizodus
 †Schizodus bifidus – type locality for species
 †Schizopea
 †Schizophoria
 †Schizophoria australis
 †Schizophoria compacta
 †Schizophoria depressa – type locality for species
 †Schizophoria striatula
 †Schizophoria strophodonta
 †Schuchertalla
 †Schuchertella
 †Schuchertella arctostriata
 †Schuchertella extensus – or unidentified comparable form
 †Schuchertella inflata
 †Schuchertella lens
 †Schuchertella nodocostata
 †Scolopodus
 †Scolopodus quadraplicatus
 †Sentosia
 †Sentosia spinigera – or unidentified comparable form
 †Septimyalina
 †Shizophoria
 †Shizophoria chouteauensis
 †Shizophoria swalleri
 †Shumardella
 †Shumardella dunbarensis
 †Siksika – type locality for genus
 †Siksika ottae – type locality for species
 †Sinuella
 †Soleniscus
 †Solenopleurella
 †Soris – type locality for genus
 †Soris labiosus – type locality for species
 †Spathognathodus
 †Spathognathodus peculiaris
 †Sphenosteges
 †Sphenotus
 †Sphenotus altidorsatus – or unidentified comparable form
  †Spirifer
 †Spirifer brazerianus – or unidentified related form
 †Spirifer centronatus
 †Spirifer greenockensis – or unidentified comparable form
 †Spirifer grimesi
 †Spirifer louisianensis – or unidentified related form
 †Spirifer marionensis – or unidentified comparable form
 †Spirifer mudulus
 †Spirifer raymondi
 †Spirifer S. centronatus Winchell – or unidentified comparable form
 †Spirifer S. grimesi Hall – or unidentified comparable form
 †Spirifer shoshonensis
 †Spirifer welleri – tentative report
  †Spiriferina
 †Spiriferina solidirostris – or unidentified comparable form
  Spirorbis
 †Spirorbis kinderhookensis
 †Spirorbis moreyi – or unidentified related form
 †Spraparallus
 †Squamaria
 †Squatinactis – type locality for genus
 †Squatinactis caudispinatus – type locality for species
 †Squillites – type locality for genus
 †Squillites spinosus – type locality for species
 †Stenoglaphyrites
 †Stenoglaphyrites hesperius
 †Stenoscisma
 †Stenoscisma obesa
    †Stethacanthus
 †Stethacanthus altonensis
 †Stigmacephalus
 †Straparollus
 †Streblochondria
 †Stutchburia
 †Sulcocephalus
 †Sulcoretepora
 †Symphysurina
 †Syntrophina
 †Syntrophina nana
 †Syntrophopsis
  †Syringopora
 †Syringopora aculeata Grity
 †Syringopora suraularia – or unidentified related form
 †Syringospira
 †Syringospira prima
 †Syringothyris
 †Syringothyris hannibalensis
 †Syringothyris typus – or unidentified comparable form

T

 †Taenicephalus
 †Teiichispira
 †Teiichispira affinis
 †Tetralobula
 †Thalattocanthus
 †Thalattocanthus consonus
 †Thamnopora
 Thurammina
 †Thuroholia
 †Thuroholia cribriformis
 †Thuroholia spicatus
 †Thysanophyllum
 †Timaniella
 †Timaniella pseudocamerata
 †Tolypammina
 †Tomagnostus
 †Tomasina – tentative report
 †Tonkinella
 †Tonkinella stephenensis – or unidentified comparable form
 †Tornoceras
 †Tornoceras crebiseptum
 †Torynifer
 †Torynifer cooperensis
 †Torynifer setiger – or unidentified comparable form
 †Torynifera
 †Torynifera montanus
 †Trachelocrinus – tentative report
 †Triplophylliltes
 †Triplophylliltes spinulosus – or unidentified comparable form
 †Trochophyllum
 †Tropidodiscus
 Tubulipora
 †Tubulipora amsdenense – tentative report
 †Tylonautilus
 †Tylothyris
 †Tylothyris clarkesvillensis
 †Tylothyris clarksvillensis
 †Tylothyris compacta
 †Tylothyris novamexicana – or unidentified comparable form

V

 †Vesiculophyllum
 †Vogelgnathus
 †Vogelgnathus campbelli

W

 †Warthia
 †Waylandella
 †Wellerella
 †Wellerella osagensis – or unidentified comparable form
 †Wendyichthys – type locality for genus
 †Wendyichthys dicksoni – type locality for species
 †Wendyichthys lautreci – type locality for species
 †Westergaardodina
 †Whidbornella
 †Whidbornella hirsuta
 †Whidbornella lachrymosa
 †Wilbernia
 †Wilkingia
 †Wilkingia inflata – type locality for species
 †Wilkingia walkeri
 †Wimanella – type locality for genus
 †Wimanella simplex – type locality for species
 †Worthenia – tentative report

X

 †Xenostegium

Y

 †Yochelsonellisa
 †Yochelsonellisa eximia

Z

 †Zaphrentites
 †Zaphriphyllum

References
 

Paleozoic
Montana